Trinity Baptist Temple Academy is a private K-12 Christian school in the ministry of Trinity Baptist Temple. The school is located in Fort Worth, Texas and serves approximately 144 students.  TBTA's mascot is the eagle; its location is misunderstood because its zip code is associated with Saginaw, Texas an inner suburb of Fort Worth. This has resulted in the school receiving misdirected negative reviews.

External links
 TBTA Website

Baptist schools in the United States
Christian schools in Texas
Educational institutions established in 1995
High schools in Tarrant County, Texas
Private K-12 schools in Texas
1995 establishments in Texas